The following list of Hawaii companies includes notable companies that are, or once were, headquartered in Hawaii.

Companies based in Hawaii

A
 ABC Stores
 Alexander & Baldwin
 Alice in Hulaland
 Aloha Air Cargo
 Aloha Collection
 Aloha Petroleum
 American Savings Bank
 Anna Miller's
 Aqua Hotels and Resorts

B
 Bank of Hawaii
 Bank of the Orient
 Bess Press
 Big Island Air
 Blue Planet Software
 Blue Startups
 Bubbies

C
 Central Pacific Bank

E
 EAH Housing

F
 First Hawaiian Bank
 Foodland Hawaii

H
 Hawai'i Academy of Recording Arts
 Hawaiian Airlines
 Hawaii Community Federal Credit Union
 Hawaiian Electric Industries
 Hawaii Medical Service Association
 Hawaii National Bank
 Hawaii State Federal Credit Union
 Hawaiian Telcom
 Hawaiian Tel Federal Credit Union
 Hitchhike Records
 Honolulu Civil Beat
 Honolulu Cookie Company

I
 Island Easter Eggs
 Island Pacific Energy

K
 Kamakura Corporation
 Kanemitsu Bakery
 Kaneohe Ranch
 Kauaʻi Island Utility Cooperative
 Koa Coffee Plantation
 Koa Books
 Kona Brewing Company
 KTA Super Stores
 Kuakini Medical Center

L
 Leonard's Bakery
 L&L Hawaiian Barbecue
 Longs Drugs

M
 Matson, Inc.
 Maui Land & Pineapple Company
 Mauna Loa Macadamia Nut Corporation
 Mokulele Airlines
 Mountain Apple Company

O
 Ohana by Hawaiian
 Outrigger Hotels & Resorts

P
 Pacific LightNet
 Phase2 International
 Polynesian Adventure Tours

R
 Reyn Spooner
 Roy's

S
 Shirokiya
 Sullivan Family of Companies
 Sunetric
 Surfing Goat Dairy

T
 Tasaka Guri-Guri
 Times Supermarkets
 Tori Richard
 Trans Executive Airlines

U
 University of Hawaii Press

V
 Vintage Cave Club
 Visionary Related Entertainment
 Volcano Winery

Y
 Young Brothers Hawaii

Z
 Zippy's

Companies formerly based in Hawaii

0-9
 50th State Big Time Wrestling

A
 Air Hawaii
 Aloha Airlines
 Amfac, Inc.

B
 Big Five
 Blossoming Lotus

C
 C. Brewer & Co.
 Code Rebel

D
 Dole Food Company

E
 ERGO Baby

G
 Go! Mokulele

H
 Hawaii Music Awards
 Hawaiian News Company
 Hawaii Superferry

I
 Inter-Island Steam Navigation Company
 Island Air

K
 Kiewit Corporation

M
 Maui and Sons
 Maui Tacos

P
 Pacific Wings

S
 Salvation Army Waiʻoli Tea Room
 Sopogy

V
 Verifone

W
 Wahoo's Fish Taco

Companies
Hawaii